The Tahirid dynasty was a culturally Arabized Sunni Muslim dynasty of Persian dehqan origin, that ruled as governors of Khorasan from 821 to 873 as well as serving as military and security commanders in Abbasid Baghdad until 891. The dynasty was founded by Tahir ibn Husayn, a leading general in the service of the Abbasid caliph al-Ma'mun. For his support of al-Ma'mun in the Fourth Fitna, he was granted the governance of Khorasan. The Tahirids initially made their capital in Merv but later moved to Nishapur. The Tahirids, however, were not an independent dynasty—according to Hugh Kennedy: "The Tahirids are sometimes considered as the first independent Iranian dynasty, but such a view is misleading. The arrangement was effectively a partnership between the Abbasids and the Tahirids." Indeed, the Tahirids were loyal to the Abbasid caliphs and in return enjoyed considerable autonomy; they were in effect viceroys representing Abbasid rule in Persia. The tax revenue from Khorasan sent to the caliphal treasury in Baghdad was perhaps larger than those collected previously.

Rulers of Khurasan

Rise
The founder of the Tahirid dynasty was Tahir ibn Husayn, a Sunni Persian of dehqan origin, who had played a major military role in the civil war between the rival caliphs al-Amin and al-Ma'mun. He and his ancestors had previously been awarded minor governorships in eastern Khorasan for their service to the Abbasids. In 821, Tahir was made governor of Khorasan, but he died soon afterwards. The caliph then appointed Tahir's son, Talha,  governor of Khorasan. Talha was unsuccessful in removing the Kharijites from Sistan, and following the death of the Kharijite leader, Hamza b. Adarak (d.828), the Tahirids occupied Zarang but never succeeded in collecting taxes in the surrounding countryside.

Tahir's other son, Abdullah, was instated as the wali of Egypt and the Arabian Peninsula, and when Talha died in 828 he was given the governorship of Khorasan. Abdullah is considered one of the greatest of the Tahirid rulers, as his reign witnessed a flourishing of agriculture in his native land of Khorasan, popularity in the eastern lands of the Abbasid caliphate and expanding influence due to his experience with the western parts of the caliphate. A noted poet, he sympathized with all things Arabic.

The replacement of the Pahlavi script with the Arabic script in order to write the Persian language was done by the Tahirids in 9th century Khurasan.

Fall

Abdullah died in 844 and was succeeded by his son Tahir II. Not much is known of Tahir's rule, but the administrative dependency of Sistan was lost to rebels during his governorship. Tahirid rule began to seriously deteriorate after Tahir's son Muhammad ibn Tahir became governor, due to his carelessness with the affairs of the state and lack of experience with politics. Oppressive policies in Tabaristan, another dependency of Khorasan, resulted in the people of that province revolting and declaring their allegiance to the independent Zaydi ruler Hasan ibn Zayd in 864. In Khorasan itself, Muhammad's rule continued to grow increasingly weak, and in 873 he was finally overthrown by the Saffarid dynasty, who annexed Khorasan to their own empire in eastern Persia.

Governors of Baghdad
Besides their hold over Khorasan, the Tahirids also served as the military governors (ashab al-shurta) of Baghdad, beginning with Tahir's appointment to that position in 820. After he left for Khorasan, the governorship of Baghdad was given to a member of a collateral branch of the family, Ishaq ibn Ibrahim, who controlled the city for over twenty-five years. During Ishaq's term as governor, he was responsible for implementing the Mihna (inquisition) in Baghdad. His administration also witnessed the departure of the caliphs from Baghdad, as they made the recently constructed city of Samarra their new capital. When Ishaq died in 849 he was succeeded first by two of his sons, and then in 851 by Tahir's grandson Muhammad ibn Abdallah.

Abdallah played a major role in the events of the "Anarchy at Samarra" in the 860s, giving refuge to the caliph al-Musta'in and commanding the defense of Baghdad when it was besieged by the forces of the rival caliph al-Mu'tazz in 865. The following year, he forced al-Musta'in to abdicate and recognized al-Mu'tazz as caliph, and in exchange was allowed to retain his control over Baghdad. Violent riots plagued Baghdad during the last years of Abdallah's life, and conditions in the city remained tumultuous after he died and was succeeded by his brothers, first Ubaydallah and then Sulayman. Eventually order was restored in Baghdad, and the Tahirids continued to serve as governors of the city for another two decades. In 891, however, Badr al-Mu'tadidi was put in charge of the security of Baghdad in place of the Tahirids, and the family soon lost their prominence within the caliphate after that.

Language and culture

The historian Clifford Edmund Bosworth explains that while the Tahirids were Persians, they were also highly Arabized in culture, and eager to be accepted in the Caliphal world where cultivation of things Arabic gave social and cultural prestige. Due to this, the Tahirids were not part of the renaissance of New Persian language and culture. He adds that the Persian language was at least tolerated in the entourage of the Tahirids, whereas the Saffarids played a leading part in the renaissance of Persian literature. Centuries later, both 'Aufi and Daulatshah wrote the Tahirids were hostile to Persian literature. 'Abd-Allah b. Tahir ordered the Persian Vamiq-u Adhra and other Persian and Zoroastrian works destroyed, according to Daulatshah.

However, according to the historian Shivan Mahendrarajah, in reference to the dynasties of the Iranian Intermezzo of which the Tahirids are considered part:
Within this context, Mahendrarajah adds that the Tahirids were specifically responsible for initiating the process by which Persian became written in the Perso-Arabic script, referring to this as "an ingenious Iranian adaption that allowed them to retain the heritage and charm of the Persian language".

The Tahirids claimed descent from Rustam, the mythological Iranian hero.

The art historian Sheila Blair explains that the Tahirids may well have added Persian inscriptions to their (now non-extant) buildings.

Members of the Tahirid dynasty

Family tree

Bold denotes a Tahirid that served as governor of Khorasan; italics denotes an individual who served as governor of Baghdad.

See also
Iranian Intermezzo
List of Muslims
List of Sunni Muslim dynasties

Notes

References

Sources

 
 

20

 
821 establishments
States and territories established in the 820s
States and territories disestablished in the 870s